The 1932 South Sydney Rabbitohs season was the 25th in the club's history. The club competed in the New South Wales Rugby Football League Premiership (NSWRFL), finishing the season as premiers and minor premiers. Initially, South Sydney lost the final to Western Suburbs, however rules at the time allowed the minor premiers the right of rematch. Souths defeated Wests, and thus were the season's premiers. Following Round 1's loss to Wests, South Sydney would win the rest of the next 13 games consecutively.

Ladder

Fixtures

Regular season

Finals

Grand final 
Although losing the final to Western Suburbs, the rules allowed the minor premiers a right to rematch in the event the minor premiers lose the final. At the time, the term "Grand Final" only referred to the match played if the minor premiers were beaten.

A grand final was scheduled on the September 24 and was the first since 1911 when Glebe was upset in both the final and grand final by Eastern Suburbs 23-10 and 11-8 respectively. South Sydney were upset in the final 8-23, but won the grand final 19-12, holding onto a 9-2 lead at half time.

References

South Sydney Rabbitohs seasons
South Sydney season